Marlon Michael Jackson (born 6 December 1990) is an English professional footballer.

Career
Born in Bristol, Jackson joined League Two club Hereford United on an initial one-month loan on 21 August 2009, alongside his clubmate and fellow young striker Tristan Plummer.
Jackson joined League Two club Aldershot Town on an initial one-month loan on 25 November 2009.

Jackson joined AFC Telford United on loan in January 2012, and scored on his debut against Kettering Town at the New Bucks Head Stadium. He rejoined the club on loan for a second period in March 2012. At the end of the 2011–12 season, he was released from Bristol City.

Hereford United
After his release from Bristol City, Jackson joined newly relegated club Hereford United on a one-year deal. He scored on his début and Hereford's first game of the season in a 2–1 win over Macclesfield Town. Following this, in his second game for the Bulls, Jackson was sent off in the first half for violent conduct, in a match which saw Hereford draw 2–2 with Tamworth F.C.

Bury
On 31 July 2013 Jackson completed a move back to the Football League by signing for League Two club Bury on a one-year deal. Jackson scored his first goal for the club, coming on as a substitute, to score the third goal in a 3–0 victory against Accrington Stanley.

On 16 January 2014, Jackson's contract was cancelled.

Lincoln City
On 25 October 2013 Jackson signed for Conference Premier club Lincoln City on a two-month loan from Bury.

FC Halifax Town
On 16 January 2014 Jackson signed for the Conference Premier club FC Halifax Town from Bury. He was released by Halifax in June 2014 and joined Oxford City.

Tranmere Rovers
On 29 August 2015 Jackson signed for National League newcomers Tranmere Rovers on a non contract basis. He was released by Tranmere in December 2014 and rejoined Oxford City.

Newport County
On 27 July 2016 Jackson signed for League Two club Newport County on a one-year contract after a successful trial period. He made his debut for Newport on 6 August 2016 versus Mansfield Town. He scored his first goal for Newport in a 3–2 EFL Cup loss against Milton Keynes Dons on 9 August 2016.
On 18 May 2017 Jackson signed a one-year contract to remain with Newport County. He was released by Newport at the end of the 2017–18 season.

Hereford F.C.
On 27 September 2018 it was announced his much rumoured signing at Hereford was completed and International clearance received. He made his debut the same day in an FA Cup draw against Truro City F.C. and scored his first goal for the club 3 days later in the replay.

Chippenham Town
In July 2020, he signed for Chippenham Town

Return to Weston
In November 2021, he returned to Southern Football League Premier Division South side Weston-super-Mare for a second spell following his departure from Chippenham Town, having been the club's top scorer during 2018–19 with nine goals.

References

External links

1990 births
Living people
Footballers from Bristol
English footballers
England semi-pro international footballers
Association football forwards
Bristol City F.C. players
Hereford United F.C. players
Aldershot Town F.C. players
Northampton Town F.C. players
Cheltenham Town F.C. players
AFC Telford United players
Bury F.C. players
Lincoln City F.C. players
FC Halifax Town players
Oxford City F.C. players
Tranmere Rovers F.C. players
Newport County A.F.C. players
Hereford F.C. players
Gloucester City A.F.C. players
Chippenham Town F.C. players
Weston-super-Mare A.F.C. players
English Football League players
National League (English football) players
Southern Football League players